Marija Colic  (born 12 April 1990) is a Serbian handball player for Nice Handball and the Serbian national team.

She was part of the team at the 2016 European Women's Handball Championship.

References

1990 births
Living people
Serbian female handball players
People from Prokuplje
Expatriate handball players
Serbian expatriate sportspeople in France